The Ministry of Environment and Rural Development of the Republic of Somaliland)  is a Somaliland government is the Somaliland branch of government charged with environmental protection.
The current minister is Shukri Haji Ismail.

Departments
The Ministry of Ministry of Environment and Rural Development consists of eight departments:
 Department of Rural Development
 ICT Department
 Human Resource Department
 Environmental Safeguard Department
 Finance and Administration Department
 Planning Department
 Rangeland and Forestry Department
 Wildlife and Parks Department

See also

 Ministry of Justice (Somaliland)
 Ministry of Finance (Somaliland)
 Ministry of Health (Somaliland)

References

External links
Somaliland Environmental Laws
Official website of the Somaliland ministry of Environment and Rural Development

Politics of Somaliland
Government ministries of Somaliland